is a district court located at 1-1-4 Kasumigaseki, Chiyoda, Tokyo, Japan.

See also
Judicial system of Japan

References

Judiciary of Japan